Haji Bulbula (born 1961) is a retired Ethiopian long-distance runner.

International competitions

External links

1961 births
Living people
Ethiopian male long-distance runners
World Athletics Championships athletes for Ethiopia
Ethiopian male cross country runners
20th-century Ethiopian people